Thomas Ignacio Galdames Millán (born 20 November 1998) is a Chilean footballer who plays as a defender for Argentine side Godoy Cruz.

Club career
In 2023, he signed with Argentine Primera División club Godoy Cruz.

International career
Galdames represented Chile U17 during 2015. In 2020, he took part of the Chile U23 squad in the Pre-Olympic Tournament, but he didn't any appearance.

Personal life
He is the son of the Chilean former international footballer Pablo Galdames, the younger brother of Pablo Jr., the older brother of Benjamín and the half-brother of Mathías Galdames. In addition, through his maternal line, he and his brothers are related to the Spanish footballer Nerea Sánchez Millán.

Career statistics

Club

Notes

References

External links
 

1998 births
Living people
Footballers from Santiago
Chilean footballers
Chilean expatriate footballers
Chile youth international footballers
Association football defenders
Unión Española footballers
Godoy Cruz Antonio Tomba footballers
Argentine Primera División players
Chilean Primera División players
Chilean expatriate sportspeople in Argentina
Expatriate footballers in Argentina